Mask of Smiles is the third solo album by British rock singer-songwriter John Waite.  It was released in mid-1985.  The previous year, Waite's "Missing You" was a No. 1 hit.

There were two singles released from this disc.  The first, "Every Step of the Way", was a No. 25 hit on Billboard's Hot 100, aided by a popular music video.  The other single, "Welcome to Paradise", fared less well, peaking at No. 85 Pop.  The album itself peaked at No. 36 on the Billboard album chart.

Track listing
 "Every Step of the Way" (John Waite, Ivan Král) – 4:09
 "Laydown" (Waite) – 3:30
 "Welcome to Paradise" (Waite) – 3:55
 "Lust for Life" (Waite, John McCurry) – 3:02
 "Ain't That Peculiar" (Smokey Robinson, Pete Moore, Marv Tarplin, Ronald White) – 3:07
 "Just Like Lovers" (Waite, Tommy Mandel) – 4:29
 "The Choice" (Waite) – 4:25
 "You're the One" (Waite, Chuck Kentis) – 3:18
 "No Brakes" (Waite) – 3:14

Personnel 
 John Waite – lead vocals
 Tommy Mandel – keyboards, synthesizers
 Chuck Kentis – electric piano
 John McCurry – lead guitars
 "Bingo" – guitars, acoustic guitar, backing vocals
 Ritchie Fliegler – 12-string guitar
 Johnny Thunders – guitars (10)
 Donnie Nossov – bass, backing vocals
 Carmine Rojas – bass
 Joey Vasta – bass
 Alan Childs – drums, percussion
 Frankie LaRocka – drums, percussion
 The Borneo Horns (Steve Elson and Stan Harrison) – horns
 Lenny Pickett – tenor sax solo (6) 
 Melanie X (Melanie Burkett) – backing vocals (5)

Production 
 John Waite – producer, mixing 
 Stephen Galfas – producer, engineer, mixing 
 Bingo – engineer (2-4)
 Gary Hellman – engineer (2-4)
 Gene Curtis – assistant engineer (2-4)
 Chris Isca – assistant engineer (2-4)
 John Luongo – remixing (2-4)
 Frederick Galfas – studio assistant 
 Tony Recascino – studio assistant
 George Marino – mastering at Sterling Sound (New York, NY).
 Henry Marquez – art direction 
 Mick Haggerty – artwork, design 
 Noriski Yokosuka – photography 
 Maxine Van-Cliffe Arakawa – fashion coordinator
 Kansai Man – clothing
 AMI (Stephen Machat and Rick Smith) – management 
 All Songs Published By House Of Cards (adm. Walk On Moon Music).

References 

1985 albums
EMI Records albums
John Waite albums